Rabb (Rabb, sometimes "rabb (-i/-u/-a)"), is often used to refer to God in Arabic (Allah) as the "Lord" or "master". It is used by adherents of various religions, including Muslims, Christians, Hindus, and Sikhs across the Middle East and Indian subcontinent in reference to the Supreme Being. The literal meaning of the word is "sustainer, cherisher, master, nourisher", which in that sense a man is the rabb of his house. The Arabic root has several meanings depending again on the context, but in this case refers to the verb yurabbu, which mean "become bigger, augment, increase, multiply, develop, prosper, raise".  Some have explained it to mean a fostering things in such a manner as to make them attain one condition after another until they reach their goal of completion. Thus, it conveys not only the idea of fostering, bringing up or nourishing, but also that of regulating, completing, accomplishing, cherishing, sustaining and bringing to maturity by evolution from the earliest state to that of the highest perfection.

In the Quran, Allah (God) refers to himself as "Rabb" in several places. When it is used with the definite article Ar (Ar-Rabb) the Arabic word denotes "the Lord (God)". In other cases, the context makes it clear as to whom the word is referring to, in this case "rabb" refers to "owner, master", for example rabb ad-Dar (رَبُّ ٱلْدَّار), means the "master of the house/residence". Rabb is also a common and acceptable first and/or last name throughout the world. In Islam, Allah is referred as "one with many qualities and attributes" (the pluralism of monism), in the first Surah al-Fatihah of the Quran, introduces this title "rabb" in the first verse, "All praise and gratitude is due to Allah (God), Rabb (Lord and Master) of all the worlds and Universe", thus stating clearly that Allah (God) takes care, nourishes, fosters through every stage of existence, in which everything between that exists. 

In the Indo-Gangetic plain, especially in the Punjab region, the term "Rabb" or "Rab" is used by Muslims, Sikhs, Hindus and Christians to refer to God.

Pre-Islamic Arabians used to believe that, while there were multiple 'aalihah (آلهة, "deities, gods"), only "God" was the "Rabb" (Lord/sustainer) of the earth and heavens. In the Jahiliyyah era of pre-Islamic Arabia, the worship of God was associated with one deity among with other lesser deities, referring to one deity for each of the 365 days in a year and therefore "God" is believed to be an abstract "Supreme Being" who is beyond any resemblance and the one who governs the heavens and earth.

It was not until later after Muhammad who introduced a new different religion centered on the notion of one God - al-Wahid, "Oneness or Uniqueness (of Allah) - which Allah is the sole Divine and is neither born from or being born of, nor associated with any other deity. One of Muhammad's aims was to reintroduce God as being the "Rabbi ’l-‘Ālamīn" or "رَبِّ الْعَالَمِينَ", which translates as "the Lord of the Worlds", who is beyond being solely a creator, but also the Only God who should be recognized by all men.

See also
Rabbi – Hebrew term that sounds much like "Rabb" and may have a similar etymology.
Rebbe – Yiddish term derived from the identical Hebrew word Rabbi. It mostly refers to the leader of a Hasidic Jewish movement.

References

 Hans Wehr, A Dictionary of Modern Written Arabic (Spoken Language Services, Ithaca, NY, 1976). ed. J. Milton Cowan. .
 Islam in the World by Malise Ruthven (Gantra Publications, 2006) 

Islamic terminology
Arabic words and phrases
Names of God in Islam